Maria de Jesus Simões Barroso Soares, GCL  (2 May 1925 – 7 July 2015) was a Portuguese politician and actress, wife of President of Portugal Mario Soares and First Lady of Portugal between 1986 and 1996.

Biography 

Barroso was the daughter of military Alfredo José Barroso from Alvor, in Algarve, and Maria da Encarnação Simões, from Fuseta, Olhão, also in the Portuguese region of Algarve.

While at university, she performed in the National Theatre for four years but was later removed as a result of her political positions as member of the Democratic Opposition to the regime of Antonio Salazar. Even though qualified to do so, during the regimes of Salazar and Marcelo Caetano, she was forbidden to teach, even in private schools.

Maria Barroso married her university colleague Mario Soares in 1949 at the 3rd Conservatory of the Civil Register of Lisbon, while he was in the Aljube prison. They had one son, politician João Soares, born 1949, and a daughter, Isabel Barroso Soares, born 1951, who manages the Colégio Moderno in Lisbon.

Although not as politically involved as her husband, Maria Barroso was a founding member of the Socialist Party in Bad Münstereifel, Germany in 1973. She was the President of the Aristides Sousa Mendes Foundation, the Pro Dignitate Association and the head of the Portuguese Red Cross for several years.

Maria Barroso had a degree in Historical and Philosophical Sciences from the Faculty of Arts, Lisbon and the course of Dramatic Arts from the National Conservatory. She was a member of the Portuguese National Theater Company and one of the most famous theater and cinema actresses in Portugal. In April 2000 she read the poetry of Sophia de Mello Breyner Andresen at the United Nations in New York in homage to Aristides Sousa Mendes. She was involved in activities aimed at supporting the areas of culture, education and family, childhood, social solidarity, female dimension, health, the integration of the disabled and the prevention of violence.

Illness and death
In June 2015, she came under medical care at Lisbon’s Red Cross Hospital, following an accident at her home. According to the family, she fell, then was transported to the hospital. Early exams revealed nothing, but her condition worsened and new exams revealed an extensive intracranial hemorrhage. She entered a coma and her nephew, surgeon Eduardo Barroso, classified the situation as "critical" and "most likely irreversible". She died on the morning of 7 July 2015.

Honours and awards

Honours

National honours
 Portugal 
 : Grand Cross of the Order of Liberty
 : Recipient of the Red Cross Medal
  Portuguese Royal Family: Honorary Dame Grand Cross of the Royal Order of Saint Isabel

Foreign honours
 : Grand Cross of the Order of Rio Branco
 : Grand Cross of the Order of Boyaca
 : Grand Cross of the Order of the Leopard
 : Grand Cross of the Order of the White Rose
 : Grand Cross of the Order of Merit
 : Grand Cross of the Order of Merit of the Federal Republic of Germany, 1st Class
 :
 : Dame Grand Cross of the Order of Merit
 : Dame Grand Cross of the Order of Adolphe of Nassau
 : Dame of the Order of Merit of the Grand Duchy of Luxembourg
 : Dame Grand Cross of the Order of the Crown
 : Dame Grand Cross of the Order of Charles III
 : Member Grand Cross of the Royal Order of the Polar Star
 : Grand Cross of the Order of Francisco de Miranda

Awards
 Doctor Honoris Causa by the University of Aveiro
 Doctorate Honoris Causa by the University of Lisbon
 Doctor Honoris Causa by Lesley College, Boston
 Honorary Professor of the Society of International Studies, Madrid
 Award "Impegno Per La Pace" of the Association Insieme per la Pace, Rome
 Award "Beca" by the Colégio Mayor Zurbaran, Madrid
 Gold Medal for Distinct Service from the League of Portuguese Firemen
 Medal of Solidarity from CNAF
 Silver Medal of the Alcuin Award
 Gold Medal from FERLAP
 Gold Medal from the City of Ovar
 Gold Medal from the City of Olhão
 Gold Medal from the City of Faro
 Personality of the Year 1998 in the area of solidarity by the Magazine Revista Gente e Viagem
 Algarvia (lady from the Algarve region) of the Year 1997 by the Association of the Algarve’s Regional Press
 Most Elegant Woman of the Year 1998 – Magazine Revista VIP
 Neckband of the International Academy of Portuguese Culture
 “One in ten women of the year 1999” Prize – Brazil
 D. Antónia Ferreira Prize
 Prestige Prize
 “Manus Cais” Trophy
 “Lonely Life” Prize – Radio Central FM, Leiria

References

External links

1925 births
2015 deaths
First Ladies of Portugal
Socialist Party (Portugal) politicians
Portuguese anti-fascists
Portuguese film actresses
Portuguese actor-politicians
People from Olhão
Spouses of prime ministers of Portugal
Grand Crosses of the Order of Liberty
Dames of the Order of Saint Isabel
Recipients of the Ordre national du Mérite
Grand Cross of the Ordre national du Mérite
Grand Crosses 1st class of the Order of Merit of the Federal Republic of Germany
Recipients of the Order of Merit of the Grand Duchy of Luxembourg
Knights of the Order of Merit of the Grand Duchy of Luxembourg
Recipients of the Order of the House of Orange
Grand Crosses of the Order of the House of Orange
Commanders Grand Cross of the Order of the Polar Star
20th-century Portuguese women politicians
Accidental deaths from falls 
Accidental deaths in Portugal
Deaths from intracranial haemorrhage